Morden (later South Morden) was an authorised railway station planned by the Wimbledon and Sutton Railway (W&SR) and Underground Electric Railways Company of London (UERL) but never built. It was to be located close to the original centre of Morden village in the London Borough of Merton, in south-west London.

Plan

The station was to have been built on the W&SR's planned surface railway line in Surrey (now south-west London) from Wimbledon to Sutton. The station was to be on the south side of Central Road. The construction of the railway was approved in 1910. In 1911 the UERL agreed to provide funding for the line's construction and to operate its train services by extending the UERL's District Railway (DR) from Wimbledon station.

Delays in the purchase of land along the railway's route and the outbreak of war prevented the works from commencing and the permission was extended several times with a final extension granted in 1922. Following the war, the UERL presented new proposals to construct an extension of the City and South London Railway (C&SLR, now part of the Northern line) from Clapham Common to Morden in tunnel where it would come to the surface and join the W&SR route. Both DR and C&SLR trains would run to Sutton.
The first C&SLR station to the north was to be named "North Morden" and the W&SR station near the village was to be named "South Morden". The plan to extend the C&SLR was opposed by the Southern Railway (SR), the operator of the mainline services through Wimbledon and Sutton. A settlement between the companies agreed that the extension of the C&SLR would end at North Morden (which opened as plain "Morden") and the W&SR would be taken over and its route would be constructed by the SR.

When the Wimbledon to Sutton line was constructed by the SR in the late 1920s, Morden village station was omitted and replaced with Morden South to the north adjacent to London Road and St Helier to the south on Green Lane.

References

Bibliography

Unbuilt London Underground stations
Proposed London Underground stations
Unopened tube stations in the London Borough of Merton